Motol (Russian and West Polesian: Мотоль,  Motele), also Motal, is a township in Ivanava Raion of Brest Region located about 30 kilometres west of Pinsk on the Yaselda River in Belarus.

History

Motal was in the Kobryn Uezd of Grodno Governorate until the collapse of the Russian Empire in 1917. Between World War I and World War II it was in the Drahichyn county of the Polish Polesie Voivodeship.

Motal was a Shtetl. In 1937, Motal had 4,297 inhabitants, of whom 1,354 were Jews. (Reinharz, 1985). 
During the war an Einsatzgruppen perpetrated a mass execution of the local Jewish community.
The Destruction of Motele (Hurban Motele) was published in Hebrew by the Council of Motele Immigrants in Jerusalem in 1956. It was edited by A.L. Poliak, Ed. Dr. Dov Yarden.  The book has 87 pages and contains memoirs and events leading up to the destruction of the Jews of Motele in 1942.

Anshe Motele Congregation, an Orthodox Jewish synagogue, was founded in Chicago on Sept. 3, 1903, by 14 immigrants who named it after Motel.

Economics 
The largest company in Motol is Agromotol.

Education 
Motol has 2 secondary schools and an art school.

Notable people 

 Chaim Weizmann, Israel's first President, was born here
 Saul Lieberman, rabbi and a scholar of Talmud
 Leonard Chess (Lejzor Czyż) and Phil Chess (Fiszel Czyż), founders of Chess Records
 Étienne Wasserzug, French biologist
 David Bartov, Israeli judge and the head of Nativ
 Serguei Palto, Russian physicist

Motal in literature 

 The Slaughterman's Daughter by Yaniv Iczkovits

References

Sources
 Jehuda Reinharz, Chaim Weizmann: The Making of a Zionist Leader (1985).
 Itzhak Epstein, ''pdf Jewish Motol: Genealogical and Family History Bibliography''

External links
 Photos at radzima.org
 Shtetl Links: Motol Home Page

Populated places in Brest Region
Brest Litovsk Voivodeship
Kobrinsky Uyezd
Polesie Voivodeship
Shtetls
Jewish Belarusian history
Holocaust locations in Belarus
Ivanava District